Edificio Lapido is a building on the 18 de Julio Avenue in Centro, Montevideo, Uruguay.

It is a multifunctional building, built in 1933 and designed by architect Juan Aubriot. It is a beautiful illustration of Uruguay's early 20th-century international architectural renewal. It is a National Heritage Site since 1989.

References

External links

Universitad ORT - Facultad de Arquitectura

Buildings and structures in Montevideo
Centro, Montevideo
Buildings and structures completed in 1933
Modernist architecture in Uruguay